Whitchurch railway station is a railway station serving Whitchurch, Cardiff, Wales.

Passenger services are provided by Transport for Wales as part of the Valley Lines network.

History
It was opened by the Cardiff Railway in 1911. Until the 1960s Whitchurch station had 2 platforms (up and down lines) plus a goods platform, a goods shed and yard, booking office, footbridge, and a staff of at least 2 including George the porter. There was also a signal box at the eastern end of the platform

Service
Monday to Saturday daytimes, there is a half-hourly service to southbound Cardiff Central and onwards to Radyr on the City Line and to Coryton northbound. Evenings there is an hourly service in each direction but there is no Sunday service.

See also
List of railway stations in Cardiff

References

External links

Railway stations in Cardiff
DfT Category F2 stations
Former Cardiff Railway stations
Railway stations in Great Britain opened in 1911
Railway stations served by Transport for Wales Rail
Whitchurch, Cardiff